The surname Gaughan is derived from the Old Gaelic name Ua Gáibhtheacháin, which dates to before the 10th century.  Its meaning is "male descendant of a fierce warrior".  However, other translations claim it means "anxious one", demonstrating their expeditious and industrious nature.  Historically, Irish families were named after the first chief of their tribe.  In this case, it is evident that this clan descends from an illustrious warrior.  Other derivatives of Ua Gáibhtheacháin are: O'Gaughan, Gavan, Gavaghan, Gavahan, Gavigan and Gahan.  

As Old Ireland evolved, the surname O'Gáibtheacháin was shortened to O'Gacháin.  This name was later anglicized into Gaughan.

Sept crest 

As in most coats of arms, this crest's components reflect the character of its people.  In the Gaughan coat of arms, the blue symbolizes their loyalty and thirst for truth, while the white represents their love of peace and serenity. The fish signify charity towards others and a truthful conscience. Furthermore, they are also associated with a desire for Jesus Christ to be one's spiritual nourishment. The ornate helmet included in the coat of arms indicates that they were men of high rank or gentlemen.

Sept history 

They are recorded as descendants of Amalgaid also known as Gaibtheachain son or grandson of Fiachra King of Connacht and as such are part of the Ui Amalgada of Connacht. Some versions of the genealogy say he was the fourth son of Nath also known as Dathi I High King of Ireland son of Fiachra King of Connacht son of Eochaid Mugmedon High King of Ireland but in others he is the brother of Nath. Amalgaid is recorded as being ancestor to the bishop Tírechán whose work is preserved in the book of Armagh.  

The history of Ireland in the 1650s is synonymous with Oliver Cromwell's pronouncement of fate for the Catholic population. The Gaughans were a chieftain tribe in Kilkenny until the Cromwellian conquest arrived to clear the way for Protestant colonization. Cromwell's transplantation and forced relocation from 1649 to 1680 impelled the Gaughans to flee Kilkenny. Those who survived the massacres were forced to settle in Connacht (County of Mayo). 

They thrived in the west of Ireland, particularly County Mayo, where they possessed territory in the Crossmolina area.  They are spoken of in the Annals of the Four Masters as chiefs of Calry in the barony of Tirawley.

Notable Gaughans 

 Bernadette Strachan, née Gaughan, English author of popular women's fiction
 Billy Gaughan (1892–1956), English footballer
 Brendan Gaughan, American stock car driver
 Dick Gaughan, Scottish musician, singer, and songwriter
 Jack Gaughan, American Science Fiction Artist and illustrator
 Jack Gaughan Award for Best Emerging Artist
 Jackie Gaughan, casino owner and operator from the early 1950s in Las Vegas, Nevada
 John Gaughan, manufacturer of magic acts and equipment for magicians based in Los Angeles, California
 Kevin Gaughan, attorney and an advocate of government reform
 Michael Gaughan (businessman), casino owner and operator in Las Vegas, Nevada
 Norah Gaughan, American knitting designer and author
 Norbert Felix Gaughan, American Catholic bishop
 Patricia Anne Gaughan, a United States federal judge
 Michael Gaughan (Irish republican), Provisional Irish Republican Army (IRA) hunger striker
 Steven F. Gaughan, police officer in Prince George's County, Maryland

References

External links 

 Cunningham, John. "Conquest and Land in Ireland: The Transplantation to Connacht, 1649–1680". 2011.
 https://web.archive.org/web/20110313144337/http://www.fleurdelis.com/meanings.htm
 http://www.surnamedb.com/Surname/Gaughan
 http://www.irelandroots.com/gaughan.htm
 http://www.ancestry.com/name-origin?view=2&surname=gaughan

Surnames of Irish origin